Alger Island (Russian: Остров Алджер; Ostrov Aldzher) is an island in Franz Josef Land, Russia. Lat 80° 22′ N, long 56° 03′ E.

Geography
There are wide unglaciated areas on the northern and the southwestern shores.

Alger Island is located north of McClintock Island, separated from it by a  narrow sound.

History
The island was discovered in 1899 by Walter Wellman on board the Capella. He named it after U.S. Secretary of War Russell A. Alger who had donated $ 250 to Wellman's expedition.

The wintering site of the 1901 failed American Baldwin-Ziegler North Pole Expedition was on Alger Island.

See also 
 List of islands of Russia
 List of glaciers in Russia

References

External links 
UNEP - Islands
 Names in Russian: :ru:Список островов России

Islands of Franz Josef Land
Uninhabited islands of Russia